The Almond is a bare, almond-shaped ridge of granite which separates the two coalescing channels of Pyramid Trough, located just west of The Pyramid on the west side of Koettlitz Glacier. Given this descriptive name by the New Zealand Victoria University of Wellington Antarctic Expedition (VUWAE), 1960–61.

Ridges of Victoria Land
Scott Coast